Cremaschi is an Italian surname. Notable people with the surname include:

Atilio Cremaschi (1923–2007), Chilean footballer
Carlo Cremaschi (born 1992), Italian footballer

Italian-language surnames
Patronymic surnames